Acacia crassuloides is a shrub belonging to the genus Acacia and the subgenus Phyllodineae. It is native to an area in the Goldfields-Esperance and Wheatbelt regions of Western Australia.

It blooms from September to October and produces yellow flowers.

See also
List of Acacia species

References

crassuloides
Acacias of Western Australia
Taxa named by Bruce Maslin